The Leadership of Muhammad: A Historical Reconstruction  is a 2021 biographical book about the leadership of the Islamic prophet  Muhammad by British-New Zealand Islamic scholar Joel Hayward.

Summary
Joel Hayward has adopted a new approach to Muhammad's leadership. He did not start with what he sees as the understandable but flawed logic found in many Islamic books on Muhammad, which maintain that Muhammad was devout, honest, compassionate, tolerant, patient, fair, decisive and courageous; and these very traits made Muhammad a great leader. Hayward says he accepts this characterization of Muhammad, but rejects it as the explanation for his success. “We simply cannot continue to claim that, because he was both a very good man and a successful leader, we must conclude that he was a successful leader because he was very good man.” Hayward says we have to look elsewhere to explain Muhammad's effectiveness as a leader.

Rather than look at Muhammad's traits or his moral character for the explanation — in other words, at how Muhammad was — we should look at what he actually did during his twenty years as a leader in Arabia. Hayward focused on what Muhammad thought and did while leading in order to ascertain whether his concepts, actions and habits reveal substantial and meaningful insights into the effectiveness of his leadership. Hayward investigated what the earliest extant Arabic sources reveal about Muhammad's capacity and aptitude for leadership in order to make a determination as to whether, and to what degree, Muhammad consciously acted in ways that produced positive results, especially the results he actually sought, during his twenty-three years as a leader.

Award
The Leadership of Muhammad was awarded the prize of Best International Non-Fiction Book at the 2021 Sharjah International Book Awards.

Reviews

Kirkus Reviews said that Hayward, who is "undeniably one of academia’s most visible Islamic thinkers," had produced "a learned history of Islam and Muhammad that succeeds in its goal of providing contemporary and future managers with valuable insights from his life on successful leadership strategies". Kirkus praised the book's "full command of Islamic theology and the Arabic language as well as its rich endnotes," and concluded that it "eschews academic and religious jargon for an accessible narrative geared toward the general public, both Muslim and non-Muslim."

The Muslim World Book Review said: "The appearance of any work by British-New Zealand scholar Joel Hayward is a matter of interest and significance for those interested in history, but the breadth, scholarship and intellectual ambition of this tome make it of particular importance. … his sources are impeccable and his interpretation irreproachable. This engrossing and sympathetic study portrays the Prophet as a highly competent and reliable human being possessed of significant political and spiritual talents. … The book is wall to wall strengths. … This volume is very intensive and disciplined, compact but with a remarkably comprehensive interior. … This book is an accessible and comprehensive presentation of a complicated issue and the author successfully combines an expert account of the biography of the Prophet with a knowledgeable investigation on the subject of efficacious leadership. … I found this book absorbing, vivid, and stimulating. This is an essential addition to the literature for both students and the general reader."

The San Francisco Book Review wrote that Hayward is a "celebrated historian and strategic studies scholar", called The Leadership of Muhammad a "ground breaking book", and awarded it five stars out of five. Reviewer Foluso Falaye described the book as "a great source of knowledge about Muhammad and the beginning of Islam." He wrote that its "critical approach will appeal to academic minds, although the language is simple and direct enough to carry all readers along." He added that, "in addition to being historically informative, it offers valuable lessons about leadership that could help world leaders, decision makers, teachers, and people from all walks of life to communicate and lead better."

Charlotte Walker of LoveReading called The Leadership of Muhammad "insightful and intellectual". Looking "not only at the theological texts,” she wrote, “Hayward references early Arabic sources to examine the ways that Muhammad excelled during his twenty-three years as a leader." The book is "authoritative and informative" and the writing is "clear and accessible throughout, making it easy to comprehend for non-academic purposes ... Whether you're looking for a book of History, Islamic studies, or an interesting look into great leadership, The Leadership of Muhammad: A Historical Reconstruction has plenty to offer."

In his review for For Reading Addicts, Mohamed A. Amer wrote: "Hayward approaches the life of Muhammad with remarkable scholarly detachment and objectivity. He had previously published books on non-Islamic leaders, including Horatio Lord Nelson, and his approach to all of them is the same. Avoiding hagiography, he creates a psychologically believable portrait of Muhammad by critically interrogating the earliest sources and by explaining Muhammad's ideas, actions and patterns of behavior in terms of the historical, geographical and cultural context in which he lived. ... Hayward's book is compactly written and argued. In only 179 tightly written pages he creates a thorough and detailed explanation of what Muhammad thought and did as a leader. He studiously avoids psychobabble and recourse to the types of modern leadership concepts and jargon that ruin so many historical accounts by making anachronistic assertions that couldn't possibly be true. ... I strongly recommend The Leadership of Muhammad. It is a ground-breaking, meticulously researched, objective account of the leadership of one of history's most influential humans. Hayward tells us a lot in a few words, but what he reveals is highly illuminating and of wide interest.

Bosnian translation

In 2022, a Bosnian translation appeared: Muhammed kao lider: historijska rekonstrukcija (Tuzla: Dialogos, 2022). ISBN 978-9926-8652-0-7.

See also
Prophetic biography
List of biographies of Muhammad

References

2021 non-fiction books
English non-fiction books
Biographies of Muhammad
English-language books
Books by Joel Hayward